Ishwardi Airport  is a domestic airport located at Ishwardi Upazila in Pabna  District. Biman Bangladesh Airlines had regular flights to Dhaka until 1996. On 18 November 2013, United Airways resumed flights to Dhaka, thus commercial services resumed after 17 years, but flights to the airport were suspended in mid 2014.

History
During World War II, the airport was known as the Hijli Base Area, and was used by the Twentieth Air Force. It hosted the United States Army Air Force XX Bomber Command 58th Bombardment Wing between 8–24 February 1945, prior to its deployment to the Mariana Islands.

Airlines and destinations
As of August 2014, no airlines serve Ishwardi Airport. United Airways was the last airline to operate there, they stopped services in mid 2014.

See also
 Operation Matterhorn
 List of airports in Bangladesh

References

Airfields of the United States Army Air Forces in British India
Airports in Bangladesh